Sir Geoffrey Owen (born 16 April 1934) is an English academic and journalist, who is the former editor of the Financial Times, and currently Head of Industrial Policy at Policy Exchange, the UK's leading Think Tank. He is also a Visiting Professor in Practice in the Department of Management, London School of Economics.

Early life
Geoffrey Owen is the son of L. G. Owen and the tennis player Violet Owen. He was also a tennis player and competed at Wimbledon during the 1950s.

Owen was educated at the Dragon School, Rugby School and Balliol College, Oxford University. He served in the Royal Air Force for two years as part of the national service.

Career
He joined the Financial Times as a feature writer in 1958. He held several posts on that paper, including those of industrial correspondent, industrial editor, and US correspondent based in New York. Between 1968 and 1973, he left journalism, serving first as an executive in the Industrial Reorganisation Corporation and then as personnel director in the overseas division of British Leyland Motor Corporation. He was deputy editor of the Financial Times from 1973 to 1980 and editor from 1981 to 1990. He was knighted in 1989.

He was a non-executive director of Laird Group plc from 2001 to the end of 2006.

Personal life
He is married to literary editor Miriam Gross.

References

Living people
1934 births
People educated at The Dragon School
People educated at Rugby School
Alumni of Balliol College, Oxford
English male journalists
Financial Times editors
Knights Bachelor
Academics of the London School of Economics
Honorary Fellows of the London School of Economics
British male tennis players
English male tennis players